CoH is the musical alias of Ivan Pavlov (Иван Павлов), a Russian-born musician, sound artist and engineer. He has lived in Sweden since 1995. After moving to Sweden, he adopted the alias CoH which can be read in both the Cyrillic and Latin alphabets. It means sleep or dream in Russian. CoH worked with singer Annie Anxiety, with Cosey Fanni Tutti, with American artist Richard Chartier (under names Chessmachine and Nice Box) as well as with the British band Coil. Together with Peter Christopherson from Coil he launched the band Soisong in 2007.

Discography

Compilation appearances
"C Is For Sleep" on Interiors (1998)
"Netmörk" on Emre (Dark Matter) (2000)
"No Balance" on ...It Just Is (2005)

References

External links
CoH official website
CoH at Allmusic
PopMatters album review: CoH - 0397 Post Pop
The Boston Phoenix album review: CoH - Strings
Exclaim! album review: CoH - Mask of Birth

Sound artists
Living people
Musical groups established in 1998
Industrial musicians
Intelligent dance musicians
Russian electronic musicians
Year of birth missing (living people)